2014 Zweigen Kanazawa season.

J3 League

References

External links
 J.League official site

Zweigen Kanazawa
Zweigen Kanazawa seasons